House at 65 Twentieth Avenue is a historic home located at Sea Cliff in Nassau County, New York. It was built in 1893 as a carriage house and converted to a summer residence in 1900. It remained as such until in 1946, when it was converted to its current status as a year-round residence.

It is a two-story, clapboard-sided building on a brick foundation with a gable roof and a cupola in the Late Victorian style.

The building was listed on the National Register of Historic Places in 1988.

References

Houses on the National Register of Historic Places in New York (state)
Victorian architecture in New York (state)
Houses completed in 1893
Houses in Nassau County, New York
National Register of Historic Places in Nassau County, New York
1893 establishments in New York (state)